Retene, methyl isopropyl phenanthrene or 1-methyl-7-isopropyl phenanthrene, C18H18, is a polycyclic aromatic hydrocarbon present in the coal tar fraction, boiling above 360 °C. It occurs naturally in the tars obtained by the distillation of resinous woods. It crystallizes in large plates, which melt at 98.5 °C and boil at 390 °C. It is readily soluble in warm ether and in hot glacial acetic acid. Sodium and boiling amyl alcohol reduce it to a tetrahydroretene, but if it heated with phosphorus and hydriodic acid to 260 °C, a dodecahydride is formed. Chromic acid oxidizes it to retene quinone, phthalic acid and acetic acid. It forms a picrate that melts at 123-124 °C.

Retene is derived by degradation of specific diterpenoids biologically produced by conifer trees. The presence of traces of retene in the air is an indicator of forest fires; it is a major product of pyrolysis of conifer trees. It is also present in effluents from wood pulp and paper mills.

Retene, together with cadalene, simonellite and ip-iHMN, is a biomarker of vascular plants, which makes it useful for paleobotanic analysis of rock sediments. The ratio of retene/cadalene in sediments can reveal the ratio of the genus Pinaceae in the biosphere.

Health effects
A recent study has shown retene, which is a component of the Amazonian organic PM10, is cytotoxic to human lung cells.

References

Petroleum products
Phenanthrenes
Biomarkers
Isopropyl compounds
Polycyclic aromatic hydrocarbons